Wisbech Town Council is a parish council covering the town of Wisbech in England.  It is the successor to the Wisbech Municipal Borough.
The Council is based at 1 North Brink, Wisbech where its committee meetings and Full Council meetings are usually held.

From May 2023 the town's eighteen councillors are spread across ten wards:- Clarence (1), Claremont (1), Clarkson (2), Medworth (2), North (2), Octavia Hill (4), Peckover East (1), Peckover West (1),  Staithe and Kirkgate (3) and Waterlees (1).
Each year they meet to elect a Town Mayor and deputy mayor.
Four staff administer and organise the council's activities.

Allotments 
A number of sites around the town are available to rent.

Castle 
Wisbech Castle  a regency villa built by Joseph Medworth is leased from Cambridgeshire County Council and run as a community resource. A business plan was drawn up and presented by Cllr Hoy. It hosts educational events, community activities and private functions.

Coat of Arms 
Granted 1929. Officially described as:
 Arms: Azure representation of St Peter and St Paul or standing within a double canopy or (Arms of the Borough of Wisbech).
 Crest: On a wreath of the colours, A 16th Century ship with three masts Or on each mast a square sail Azure the centre one charged with two keys in saltire wards upwards and the other two charged with a castle Or (Crest of the Borough of Wisbech).
These were transferred from the Borough of Wisbech to the Town Council.

Christmas Lighting 
The council organise the erection of Christmas Trees and lighting along the River Nene and around the town. The lights switch on event is usually late November. The council obtained a controversial Christmas tree from Peterborough, this was erected at the opposite end of the market Place from the traditional Christmas tree and attracted wide media coverage on TV News.

Council Chamber  
The council chamber is in a listed building and contains historic items connected with the town's civic heritage. An online guide to the chamber has been created. The chamber contains a number of portraits and other paintings. One is that of the Rev Abraham Jobson DD painted in 1824 by Jacob George Strutt.In March 2021 it was alleged that the chamber was being used as the location for a police surveillance camera, this was refuted by the clerk.

Councillors 
A number of former councillors have progressed to become parliamentary candidates and MPs. Malcolm Moss's political career started as a Wisbech Town councillor in 1979. The council is composed of a diverse membership. The minimum age to be a councillor was lowered from 21 to 18 by the Electoral Administration Act 2006. The Wisbech Standard reported that twenty-two year old Samantha Hoy was the youngest ever member when she was co-opted onto the council in 2009. This was incorrect as Cllr Bennett had won an election to the council 30 years earlier in 1979 as a twenty-one year old. Cllr W Retchless was also elected as a twenty-one year old in 1987.
Elections are due to be held on 4 May 2023 for all the wards of the Town Council on the same day as elections to Fenland District Council. The Local Government Boundary Commission have proposed new wards.

Current Councillors (2021)
Key
(* former mayor)
(f also FDC councillor)
(c also CCC councillor)

Freedom 
The council may confer the freedom of the town on individuals or organisations.
1996 No.1 Company, Cambridgeshire Army Cadet Force.
2001 James Gee Pascoe Crowden, LL, KStJ, JP
2010 Jody Alan Cundy CBE
2013 Richard Symond Gyles Barnwell, DL
2015 Malcolm Douglas Moss
2015 Royal British Legion Riders involved on the Cambs876 Remembered Project 
2017 Gerald Fleming 
2017 John McIntosh 
2017 Ronald Sanderson 
2019 Wisbech In Bloom 
2019 The Vivien Fire Engine Trust

Grants 
The council makes grants available to charities and voluntary groups.

Markets 
The Town Council operates a market on the Market Place seven days-a-week. Well-established and renowned stalls offering good, fresh, local produce, others a range of bargain goods. There are a variety of stalls, some trading during the week, others on a regular basis on a set day. Speciality stalls provide goods and services. In 2022 the Market Place was relandscaped, the existing surface was removed and a new surface laid down, in the centre of which was a representation of the town's 'coat of arms'.

Mega-incinerator 
The council formed a working party and set aside £35k to oppose the proposed Mega-incinerator to be constructed in the town.

Publications 
  Wisbech Annual Guide and Map (produced and distributed to local households each year).
 Wisbech Town Council Civic Handbook (2011)
 Code of Conduct (2012)
Standing Orders (2019) 
 A brief guide to Wisbech Town Council's Council Chamber

Rock Concert 
The annual Wisbech Rock Concert organised by the council is held in Wisbech park each summer.

Wis-beach Day 
Once a year Wisbech reverts to being a seaside town. The Market Place is covered in sand. Donkey rides, Punch and Judy shows and other entertainments occupy  the town centre.

Mart Fair 
This annual two-week fair held during March still occupies the Market-Place and attracts large crowds although there are no longer the menageries of animals and theatrical performances seen in the 18th and 19th centuries.

Mayor 
At its inception the newly formed Town Council resolved that the Chairman be styled Town Mayor. Mayor's role is largely ambassadorial, attending community events, opening shops and businesses and acting as a representative of the town in neighbouring areas. The Mayor also hosts a number of fundraising events throughout the year raising money for chosen charities.

'It is custom and practice on this Council for the Mayor to be selected on seniority and long service, whilst being mindful to select, where possible, a member who has not served as Mayor before. It is also custom and practice for this Town Council to select a Mayor Elect prior to the Annual Meeting who will then go forward to be considered by Full Council at the Annual Meeting.
At the same time as a Mayor Elect, it is also custom and practice to select a Deputy Mayor Elect, who will then also be considered and elected by Full Council at the Annual Council Meeting.'

Mayor making 
Each year the councillors at the Annual Council Meeting in May elect members to be the town mayor and deputy mayor. The fur trimmed robes used for mayor-making were created for local shipping magnate Richard Young five years consecutively Mayor of the Borough of Wisbech. It is now unusual to be mayor in consecutive years. The event usually takes place in the council chamber, exceptionally in 2020 this took place online.
In May 2021 Wisbech Castle hosted the Mayor-making for the first time.

Social media 
Both the Mayor  and the council  utilise social media to promote the town and council.

Statute Fair 

This annual one-week fair held in September occupies the Chapel Road carpark and attracts large numbers of visitors to the town.

Election Results

May 2023

May 2021

May 2019

June 2018 

Previous election 2015.

References 

Parish councils of England
Local precepting authorities in England
Local authorities in Cambridgeshire
Town Council